The following is a list of educational institutions in Varanasi. Varanasi (known earlier as Benares) is a city situated on the banks of the River Ganges in the Indian state of Uttar Pradesh and is approximately 800 kilometres (497 mi) southeast of national capital Delhi.

Universities
 
 Banaras Hindu University (Institutes of Eminence) 
 Central Institute of Higher Tibetan Studies (Deemed University)
 Indian Institute of Technology (Institutes of National Importance)
 Mahatma Gandhi Kashi Vidyapith
 Sampurnanand Sanskrit University

Colleges/Institutes

 Arya Mahila Mahavidyalaya 
 Asha Pharmacy College 
 DAV Post Graduate College
 Dr. Shashi Kant Singh Mahavidyalaya
 Faculty of Arts, Banaras Hindu University
 Faculty of Commerce, Banaras Hindu University
 Faculty of Sanskrit Vidya Dharma Vigyan
 Faculty of Science, Banaras Hindu University
 Faculty of Social Sciences, Banaras Hindu University
 Harish Chandra Postgraduate College
Indian Institute of Handloom Technology
Indian Institute of Vegetable Research
 Institute of Pharmacy
International Rice Research Institute
 Kashi Institute of Pharmacy
 KJ College of Pharmacy
 Mission College of Pharmacy
National Institute of Fashion Technology (Rae Bareli Extension)
National Seed Research and Training Centre
National School of Drama
Prabhu Narayan Government Inter College
 Raj School Of Management and Sciences 
 Saraswati Higher Education & Technical College of Pharmacy
 School of Management Sciences
 Sri Agrasen Kanya P.G. College
 Subhash Chandra Mahavidyalaya
 Sunbeam College for Women
 Udai Pratap Autonomous College 
 Varanasi College Of Pharmacy
 Vasant Kanya Mahavidyalaya

Engineering Colleges
 Ambition Institute of Technology
 Ashoka Institute of Technology and Management
 Banaras Institute of Polytechnic and Engineering
 Jeevandeep Institute of Management & Technology
 Kashi Institute of Technology
 Microtek College of Technology and Management
 Rajarshi School of Management and Technology (RSMT)
 Saraswati Higher Education & Technical College of Engineering
 SHEAT College of Engineering
 Shree Bhagwat Institute of Technology

Medical Colleges
Faculty of Ayurveda, Banaras Hindu University
 Shri Krishna Ayurvedic Medical College and Hospital
Ayurvedic College and Hospital
Institute of Medical Sciences, Banaras Hindu University
 Heritage Institute of Medical Sciences
UP Board Schools
Udai Pratap inter college varanasi

Bengali Tola Inter College
Besant Theosophical High School
C.M. Anglo Bengali Inter College
Cutting Memorial Inter College
Government Girls Inter College
Harishchandra Inter Collage
Queens Inter College
Sanatan Dharm Inter College
Shri Agrasen Kanya Inter College

CBSE Schools
S S Public School, Babatpur

Jaipuria School, Babatpur
Army Public School
Aryan International School
Central Hindu Boys School
Central Hindu Girls School
DALIMSS Sunbeam School, Mahmoorganj
DALIMSS Sunbeam School, Paharia
DALIMSS Sunbeam School, Ramkatora
DALIMSS Sunbeam School, Rohania
DALIMSS Sunbeam School, Sigra
Delhi Public School (Kashi), Airport Road
Delhi Public School (Varanasi), Mohansarai
GD Goenka School
Guru Nanak English School 
Jawahar Navodaya Vidyalaya
Jaipura School, Babatpur
Kendriya Vidyalaya, BHU
Kendriya Vidyalaya, Cantt
Kendriya Vidyalaya, DLW
Kendriya Vidyalaya, DLW (Campus 2)
Little Flower House, Ashapur
Little Flower House, Kakarmatta
Divine Sainik School , Lahartara
Glenhill School, Manduadih 
Mount Litera Zee School
Raj English School
Rajghat Besant School
Sant Atulanand Residential Academy
Sant Atulanand Convent School
St. Mary's Convent School, Sonatalab
St. Thomas International School
St. Xavier's High School
Seth Anandram Jaipuria School
Seth MR Jaipuria Schools, Babatpur
Seth MR Jaipuria Schools, Padao
SOS Hermann Gmeiner School
Sunbeam Academy, Durgakund
Sunbeam Academy, Knowledge Park
Sunbeam Academy, Samneghat
Sunbeam Academy, Sarainandan
Sunbeam School, Annapurna
Sunbeam School, Babatpur  
Sunbeam School, Bhagwanpur 
Sunbeam School, Indiranagar
Sunbeam School, Lahartara
Sunbeam School, Sarnath
Sunbeam School, Suncity
Sunbeam School, Varuna 
Swami Harsewanand Public School, Banpurwa
Swami Harsewanand Public School, Garhwaghat
Swami Harsewanand Public School, Jagatganj
R.S. Convent Sainik school, Ledhupur

ICSE Schools

Bal Bharati Public School
George Frank Christian English School
St. Francis School
St Joseph's Convent School
St. John's School, DLW
St. John's School, Marhauli
St. John's School, Ledhupur
St. Mary's Convent School, Cantt
W.H. Smith Memorial School

References

Education in Varanasi
Varanasi
Varanasi-related lists
Varanasi